CMP-N-acetylneuraminate-poly-alpha-2,8-sialyltransferase is an enzyme that in humans is encoded by the ST8SIA4 gene.

The protein encoded by this gene catalyzes the polycondensation of alpha-2,8-linked sialic acid required for the synthesis of polysialic acid, a modulator of the adhesive properties of neural cell adhesion molecule (NCAM1). The encoded protein, which is a member of glycosyltransferase family 29, is a type II membrane protein that may be present in the Golgi apparatus. Two transcript variants encoding different isoforms have been found for this gene.

References

Further reading

EC 2.4.99